Paesaggi toscani (Tuscan Landscapes) is a rhapsody for orchestra composed in 1922 by Vincenzo Tommasini; it was introduced in Rome in December, 1923.  The piece is based on Tuscan folk melodies, and is played in two uninterrupted sections.  The first, marked Andante sostenuto, presents a melancholy melody against a somewhat nebulous harmonic backdrop; the second movement, marked Vivace, changes the mood of the piece with two lively tunes.

References
David Ewen, Encyclopedia of Concert Music.  New York; Hill and Wang, 1959.

1922 compositions
Compositions by Vincenzo Tommasini
Rhapsodies
Compositions for symphony orchestra